Bharia may refer to:
Bharia language, a language of Madhya Pradesh, India
Bharia people, tribal people of Madhya Pradesh, India

See also
 Bahria (disambiguation)
 Bharya (disambiguation)